Comet C/2002 V1 (NEAT) is a non-periodic comet that appeared in November 2002. The comet peaked with an apparent magnitude of approximately –0.5, making it the eighth-brightest comet seen since 1935. It was seen by SOHO in February 2003. At perihelion the comet was only  from the Sun. (Slight controversy arose when the comet failed to break up when it approached the Sun, as expected by some scientists if it were a small comet.)

The comet was hit by a coronal mass ejection during its pass near the Sun. Speculation that the CME was caused by the comet's close approach was dismissed by scientists; comets and CMEs occur close together in time only by coincidence, and there were 56 CMEs in February 2003. On February 18, 2003, comet C/2002 V1 (NEAT) passed 5.7 degrees from the Sun. C/2002 V1 (NEAT) appeared impressive as viewed by the Solar and Heliospheric Observatory (SOHO) as a result of the forward scattering of light off of the dust in the coma and tail. After the comet left LASCO's field of view, on February 20, 2003, an object was seen at the bottom of a single frame. Although technicians dismissed this as a software bug, rumours persisted that the object had been expelled from the Sun.

The orbit of a long-period comet is properly obtained when the osculating orbit is computed at an epoch after leaving the planetary region and is calculated with respect to the center of mass of the solar system. Using JPL Horizons, the barycentric orbital elements for epoch 2020-Jan-01 generate a semi-major axis of 1,100 AU, an apoapsis distance of 2,230 AU, and a period of approximately 37,000 years.

References

External links 
 
 Surf the Web to see the Sun-dancing comet (ESA 2003-Feb-12)
 Comet Neat Passes an Erupting Sun (APOD 2003 February 24)
 Spacewatch Friday: Promising New Comet Called NEAT (C/2002 V1) Graces Evening Sky – Space.com
 News story as comet hit by Coronal Mass Ejection
 Article about the Comet NEAT Conspiracy
 Images of Comet NEAT taken by LASCO during perihelion
 SOHO Hotshots of Comet NEAT

Sungrazing comets
20021106